Greenway, Virginia may refer to:
Greenway, Charles City County, Virginia
Greenway, Nelson County, Virginia